Flipped SO(10) is a grand unified theory which is to standard SO(10) as flipped SU(5) is to SU(5).

Details
In conventional SO(10) models, the fermions lie in three spinorial 16 representations, one for each generation, which decomposes under [SU(5) × U(1)χ]/Z5 as

This can either be the Georgi–Glashow SU(5) or flipped SU(5).

In flipped SO(10) models, however, the gauge group is not just SO(10) but SO(10)F × U(1)B or [SO(10)F × U(1)B]/Z4. The fermion fields are now three copies of

These contain the Standard Model fermions as well as additional vector fermions with GUT scale masses. If we suppose [SU(5) × U(1)A]/Z5 is a subgroup of SO(10)F, then we have the intermediate scale symmetry breaking [SO(10)F × U(1)B]/Z4 → [SU(5) × U(1)χ]/Z5 where

In that case,

note that the Standard Model fermion fields (including the right handed neutrinos) come from all three [SO(10)F × U(1)B]/Z4 representations. It is left up to the reader to determine the group from the context. This is a standard practice in the GUT model building literature anyway).

The other remaining fermions are vectorlike. To see this, note that with a 161H and a  Higgs field, we can have VEVs which breaks the GUT group down to [SU(5) × U(1)χ]/Z5. The Yukawa coupling 161H 161 10−2 will pair up the 5−2 and  fermions. And we can always introduce a sterile neutrino φ which is invariant under [SO(10) × U(1)B]/Z4 and add the Yukawa coupling

OR we can add the nonrenormalizable term

Either way, the 10 component of the fermion 161 gets taken care of so that it is no longer chiral.

It has been left unspecified so far whether [SU(5) × U(1)χ]/Z5 is the Georgi–Glashow SU(5) or the flipped SU(5). This is because both alternatives lead to reasonable GUT models.

One reason for studying flipped SO(10) is because it can be derived from an E6 GUT model.

References

 Nobuhiro Maekawa, Toshifumi Yamashita, "Flipped SO(10) model", 2003
 K. Tamvakis, "Flipped SO(10)", 1988

Grand Unified Theory